The Parliamentary Assembly of the Mediterranean (PAM) is an international organization established in 2005 by the national parliaments of the countries of the Euro-Mediterranean region. It is the legal successor of the Conference on Security and Cooperation in the Mediterranean (CSCM), launched in the early ‘90s.

The PAM was originally headquartered in Malta, in recognition of Malta's strategic role and commitment in organizing the PAM. The current headquarters is located in Naples, Italy. PAM also has offices in the Republic of San Marino.

PAM also has Permanent Observers to the UN in Geneva, New York and Vienna, a Liaison Officer with UNSCO and UNIFIL in Jerusalem, and a Permanent Representation to LAS in Cairo.

Objectives
The main objective of PAM is to forge political, economic and social cooperation among the Member States in order to find common solutions to the challenges facing the Euro-Mediterranean and Gulf region, and to create a space for peace and prosperity for its peoples.

PAM is the centre of excellence for regional parliamentary diplomacy, and a unique forum whose membership is open exclusively to Euro-Mediterranean and Gulf countries, which are represented on equal footing. This is reflected in the composition of the Bureau and the alternating Presidency. The pro-tempore President of PAM is  Gennaro Migliore. Each national delegation has up to five members with equal voting rights and decision-making powers.

PAM conducts the bulk of its work within three Standing Committees. It convenes annually in a Plenary Session. It may also set up Working Groups, ad-hoc Committees or Special Task Forces to tackle a particular topic (i.e. Counter-Terrorism, Confidence Building, Peace Support, Conflict Resolution, Middle East Peace Process, Mass Migration, Free Trade and Investments, Economic Integration, Climate Change, Energy, Human Rights, Dialogue of Civilizations, Gender issues, etc…). The main operational and coordination instruments of PAM in these fields are Field Missions, Electoral Observation Teams, the Economic Panel on Trade and Investments, the Academic Platform and the Women Parliamentary Forum.

Although the reports and resolutions adopted by PAM are not legally binding per se, they are a powerful “soft diplomacy” tool when dealing with parliaments, governments and civil society in the region.

Secretariat
The international Secretariat, an autonomous and independent body of the Assembly, assists and advises the PAM President, the PAM Bureau and all members in the execution of their mandate and is responsible for the follow-up on the decisions taken by the Assembly providing coordination, assistance and support to the work of the Committees and all other bodies established under PAM.

The Secretariat interacts with national delegations, as well as with regional and international bodies sharing an interest in the PAM region. It has the mandate to stimulate the activities of the Assembly. It also coordinates the awarding of the PAM Prize dedicated to individuals or institutions whose work is considered of great value for the PAM region.

The Secretary General, assisted by international and local staff, coordinates the activities of the Assembly

The PAM Secretariat is also entrusted with the parliamentary dimension of the 5+5 Western Mediterranean Forum and the MEDCOP.

Relations with non-Mediterranean countries and international institutions
The membership criteria and geographical location of its members position PAM as a central actor in the Mediterranean region.

The General Assembly of the United Nations granted observer status to the Parliamentary Assembly of the Mediterranean, by the Resolution A/RES/64/124, at its 64th Session on 16 December 2009.

An essential link with civil society, parliamentarians are key to any political decision-making process. In order to ensure coherence and coordination in decision processes, including social peace, it is necessary that parliamentarians fully participate in today’s regional debates thereby contributing to the elaboration of policies that bear both an immediate impact and a long-term impact for future generations. Today’s challenges, including mass migration, climate change and most importantly the resurgence of conflicts and the evolution of terrorism, require a collective effort, goodwill and confidence-building measures.

The political dialogue established among members of PAM, in particular with respect to the Middle East issues, Syria and Libya crises, and the Russian aggression against Ukraine, are of crucial importance.

To further its objectives, PAM encourages the inter-governmental support of the main actors in the region as well as regional institutions.

Membership

As of 2022, there are 31 member parliaments, 2 associate member states, 1 candidate member, 60 guest/partner states and organizations, and 13 observer organizations.

Member states

Associate member states

Candidate member
  (suspended)

Guest/partner states and organizations
 
 
 
 
 
 
 
 
 
 
 African Parliamentary Union
 Arab IPU
 Arab Parliament
 Asian Parliamentary Assembly
 Baltic Sea Parliamentary Conference
 Conseil Consultatif de l’UMA
 European Parliament
 IPA CIS
 Interparliamentary Assembly on Orthodoxy
 Inter-Parliamentary Union
 NATO-PA
 OSCE-PA
 PABSEC
 Parliamentary Assembly of the Council of Europe
 Parliamentary Assembly of the Francophonie Pan-African Parliament
 PA-UfM
 PUIC
 Parliamentary Network of the World Bank and IMF
 SEECP PA
 
 CTBTO
 EBRD
 European Investment Bank
 EUROMED
 European Court of Human Rights
 
 European Commission
 FEMISE
 
 
 IRENA
 
 
 North-South Centre of the Council of Europe
 Organization of the Islamic Cooperation
 OECD
 Union du Maghreb arabe
 UfM
 UN System
 UNEP
 FISPMED
 UNCTAD
 UNODC
 UNOCT
 World Bank
 
 WTO
 Anna Lindh Foundation
 ASCAME, BUSINESS MED
 Euro-Mediterranean University (EMUNI)
 FIDU
 Mediterranean Citizens’ Assembly Foundation
 MEDREG
 MED-TSO
 Women Political Leaders

Observers
 Arab Inter-parliamentary Union
 Preparatory Commission for the Comprehensive Nuclear-Test-Ban Treaty Organization
 Euro-Mediterranean University of Slovenia
 Fondazione Mediterraneo
 
 Maghreb Consultative Council of the Arab Maghreb Union
 Mediterranean Citizens Assembly Foundation
 Mediterranean Energy Regulators (MEDREG)
 Parliamentary Assembly of the Union for the Mediterranean
 Parliamentary Assembly of the Organisation of the Black Sea Economic Cooperation
 Organization of Islamic Cooperation
 
 World Meteorological Organisation

Cooperation with other organizations
In addition to the above, PAM also cooperates (to various degrees) with other international organizations, including the:	
 Arab Parliament
 Council of Europe	
 European Bank for Reconstruction and Development
 European Investment Bank
 Interparliamentary Assembly on Orthodoxy	
 Parliamentary Assembly of the Commonwealth of Independent States

See also 

 Euro-Mediterranean Parliamentary Assembly

References

External links
 Official website

 
Parliamentary assemblies
Organizations established in 2005
Continental unions
International organisations based in Italy